Ece Mumcuoglu (born 17 December 1996) is a Turkish rhythmic gymnast.

She competed at the 2014 Rhythmic Gymnastics European Championships, and 2014 Rhythmic Gymnastics World Championships.

References 

1996 births
Living people
Turkish rhythmic gymnasts